Rodrigo Contreras Pinzón (born June 2, 1994, in Villapinzón) is a Colombian cyclist, who currently rides for Amateur Team . In October 2020, he was named in the startlist for the 2020 Giro d'Italia.

Major results

2013
 1st Stage 6 Vuelta a Bolivia
2014
 Pan American Under-23 Road Championships
1st  Time trial
4th Road race
 2nd Time trial, National Under-23 Road Championships
2015
 1st Stage 1 (TTT) Czech Cycling Tour
 5th Overall Tour de San Luis
1st  Young rider classification 
2016
 1st Stage 1 (TTT) Tour de San Luis
2017
 1st  Time trial, Bolivarian Games
 2nd  Time trial, Pan American Road Championships
 2nd Time trial, National Road Championships
2018
 South American Games
1st  Time trial
5th Road race
 1st  Time trial, Central American and Caribbean Games
 Vuelta a Colombia
1st Prologue & Stage 7 (ITT)
 4th Time trial, Pan American Road Championships
 4th Time trial, National Road Championships
2019
 4th Time trial, National Road Championships
 10th Overall Tour du Rwanda
1st Stage 8
 10th Overall Tour Colombia
2022
1st Time Trial, Pan American Championships
1st Overall Vuelta al Valle del Cauca
1st Stages 3 & 4
1st Overall Clásica Rionegro con Futuro-Aguas de Rionegro
1st Stage 2
1st Overall Clásica Ciudad de Girardot
1st Prologue
1st Overall Clásica de Fusagasugá
1st Stage 1
1st Overall Clásica Carmen de Viboral
1st Stage 1 (TTT)
 Bolivarian Games
2nd  Road race
2nd  Time trial
2nd Overall Vuelta al Tolima
 5th Time trial, National Road Championships
9th Overall Vuelta a Colombia
1st Stage 10

Grand Tour general classification results timeline

References

External links

1994 births
Living people
Colombian male cyclists
People from Cundinamarca Department
Vuelta a Colombia stage winners
21st-century Colombian people
Competitors at the 2018 Central American and Caribbean Games
South American Games medalists in cycling
South American Games gold medalists for Colombia
South American Games silver medalists for Colombia
Competitors at the 2018 South American Games
Competitors at the 2022 South American Games